Senonnes is a commune in the Mayenne department in north-western France.

Geography
The Semnon flows westward through the southern part of the commune, crosses the village, then forms most of the commune's south-western border.

See also
Communes of the Mayenne department

References

Communes of Mayenne